NGC 3195 (also known as Caldwell 109) is a planetary nebula located in the southern constellation of Chamaeleon. It is the most southern of all the bright sizable planetary nebula in the sky, and remains concealed from all northern observers.

The central star is listed as >15.3V or 16.1B magnitude. An analysis of Gaia data suggests that the central star is a binary system. Distance is estimated at about 1.7 kpc.

References

External links
 
 The Hubble European Space Agency Information Centre: pictures and information on NGC 3195

Planetary nebulae
3195
109b
Chamaeleon (constellation)
18350212
Discoveries by John Herschel